The following notable Azerbaijani characters have appeared in fictional works.

The Azerbaijani people or Azeris, are an ethnic group indigenous to Azerbaijan and Iran.

Fictional Azerbaijani characters 

 Ali Khan Javanshir, descendant from Shirvanshah dynasty, graduate from Baku gymnasium, politician in Azerbaijan Democratic Republic in Kurban Said's romance novel.
 Dede Qorqud, prophetic singer-storyteller in Book of Dede Korkut, the epic story about Oghuz Turks.
 Drongo, secret agent and hero of the novels by Chingiz Abdullayev.
 Jazibe Abbasova, a character from the Turkish television show Yahşi Cazibe.
 Kara-Gasim, bandit loved by public, temporary companion of Erast Fandorin.
 Mashadi Ibad, rich merchant, from Uzeyir Hajibeyov's musical comedy If Not That One, Then This One.
 Ferdinand Kerimov, also known as Mr. K, home theater technician, a character from Grand Theft Auto V. He is voiced by Armin Amiri.
 Tahir Javan, wealthy businessman, a character from Grand Theft Auto V.
 Samed Vezirzade, the main antagonist of the game Tom Clancy’s Rainbow Six: Rogue Spear
 Amir Kaffarov, one of the main villains of the game Battlefield 3

See also 
List of Azerbaijanis

References 

Azerbaijani